Donald Random Murphy (January 29, 1918 – May 19, 2008) was an American film and television actor. He was known for playing Wyatt Earp's brother Virgil Earp in the 1954 film Masterson of Kansas.

Murphy was born in Chicago, Illinois. He played Johnny Ringo and two other roles in the western television series The Life and Legend of Wyatt Earp. He made appearances in television westerns such as Tombstone Territory (as Anson Gurney), Lawman (as Jack O'Reilly), Shotgun Slade (as Hal Bates), and Bat Masterson (as Charlie Ryan). Murphy guest-starred in the legal drama television series Perry Mason. He retired from acting in 1971, when he moved to Santa Fe, New Mexico to work as an interior designer.

Murphy died in May 2008 at his home in Santa Fe, New Mexico, at the age of 90.

Partial filmography

References

External links 

Rotten Tomatoes profile

1918 births
2008 deaths
People from Chicago
Male actors from Chicago
Male actors from Illinois
American male film actors
American male television actors
20th-century American male actors
Western (genre) television actors
Interior designers